4-Phenylpiperidine is a chemical compound. It features a benzene ring bound to a piperidine ring. 

4-Phenylpiperidine is the base structure for a variety of opioids, such as pethidine (meperidine), ketobemidone, alvimopan, loperamide, and diphenoxylate.

See also 
 MPTP

References

External links

 
4-Piperidinyl compounds